Screw is a British prison drama series starring Nina Sosanya and Jamie-Lee O'Donnell. The series was produced by STV Studios and first broadcast on Channel 4 on 6 January 2022. It has been renewed for a second series.

Plot
The series follows two prison officers and their colleagues, working in C-Wing of men's prison, Long Marsh.

Cast
Jamie-Lee O'Donnell as Rose Gill
Nina Sosanya as Leigh Henry
Faraz Ayub as Ali Shah
Laura Checkley as Jackie Stokes
Stephen Wight as Gary Campbell
Ron Donachie as Don Carpenter
Bill Blackwood as Tony Tanner
Mark Newsome as Streaky
Jake Davies as Stephen Childs
Nicholas Lumley as Larry
Ben Tavassoli as Louis Costa
Jorden Myrie as Raheem Bennett

Production
The series was inspired by Williams's work with prisons. Kelvin Hall film studio, Glasgow and  Peterhead Prison in Scotland were used as the filming locations.

Episodes

Reception
Rebecca Nicholson for The Guardian gave it four out of five and said: "(Screw) settles somewhere between soap and Sunday night blockbuster, and I mean that as a compliment. This is broad and warm and welcoming, with enough of a sharp side to make it worth sticking with." The Times also gave it four out of five and praised the use of humour.

References

External links
Screw on All 4

2022 British television series debuts
2020s British drama television series
2020s prison television series
Channel 4 television dramas
English-language television shows
Television series by STV Studios